James Mullen (6 January 1923 – 23 October 1987) was an English international footballer who played as an outside left.

Mullen spent his whole career at Wolverhampton Wanderers where he won three English Football League championships and the FA Cup. He also represented the England national team at both the 1950 and 1954 World Cup.

Career 
Mullen joined the Midlanders in June 1937, turned professional on his 17th birthday, and remained with the club until his retirement in May 1960. His league debut came in February 1939, in a 4–1 win over Leeds United. He made 488 appearances in total, scoring 112 goals, helping the club win their only three league titles (1953–54, 1957–58 and 1958–59) as well as the FA Cup in 1949.

He also played for England, earning 12 caps. He became England's first ever substitute in an international on 18 May 1950, scoring against Belgium at Heysel Stadium in a 4–1 win. He also played in the 1950 FIFA World Cup and the 1954 FIFA World Cup. He scored 6 goals, including in the 1954 World Cup against Switzerland.

During wartime, he served as a soldier in the Army from 1942 onward, based at Farnborough, Catterick and Barnard Castle. After retiring from football, he ran a sports shop in Wolverhampton until shortly before his death.

Career statistics

Honours
Wolverhampton Wanderers
 First Division: 1953–54, 1957–58, 1958–59; runners-up:1938–39, 1949–50, 1954–55
 FA Cup: 1949
 FA Charity Shield: 1949 (Shared)

References

External links
Official Wolves profile 
Wolves Heroes

1923 births
1987 deaths
English footballers
England international footballers
England wartime international footballers
Wolverhampton Wanderers F.C. players
Reading F.C. wartime guest players
1950 FIFA World Cup players
1954 FIFA World Cup players
English Football League players
British Army personnel of World War II
Footballers from Newcastle upon Tyne
English Football League representative players
Association football forwards
FA Cup Final players